István Szepesi (born 25 June 1959) is a Hungarian judoka. He competed in the men's half-heavyweight event at the 1980 Summer Olympics.

References

1959 births
Living people
Hungarian male judoka
Olympic judoka of Hungary
Judoka at the 1980 Summer Olympics
Martial artists from Budapest